David Wiltshire (born 8 July 1954) is an English former professional footballer who played as a right-back for Gillingham between 1973 and 1977, making 67 appearances in the Football League.

References

1954 births
Living people
People from Folkestone
English footballers
Association football fullbacks
Gillingham F.C. players
Canterbury City F.C. players